Mareco Broadcasting Network, Inc. is a radio network in the Philippines. Mareco stands for Mabuhay Records Corporation as its parent company also owns Villar Records and Mabuhay Records. Its headquarters is located at #6 Tirad Pass Street, Sta. Mesa Heights, Quezon City. The company operates stations across places in the country under the Q Radio branding (under an airtime lease agreement with Horizon of the Sun Communications), as well as the 24-hour smooth-jazz internet radio station Crossover Radio Online. It also provides management and marketing consultancy for radio companies in the country.

MBNI stations

Radio stations
The stations previously carried the Crossover branding since their inception in the 90s. On December 30, 2019, Horizon of the Sun Communications (producer of Chinese Filipino oriented shows Chinatown TV and Chinese News TV on IBC 13) took over the station's operations. The Q Radio branding was launched on January 13, 2020. Meanwhile, its provincial stations started carrying the said brand on November 16, 2020.

Defunct TV stations

Crossover Radio Online

Crossover (presently known as Crossover Radio Online) is a smooth jazz/adult contemporary radio brand of Mareco Broadcasting Network. It began its broadcast on terrestrial in 1994, and officially migrated to digital-only via internet radio on December 30, 2019.

Much like its previous broadcast on FM, it still carries the same programming and international news bulletins from BBC World Service and Voice of America.

Network profile
In the early 1990s, Mareco underwent several changes in management which led to the birth of the new network, Crossover. The new brand was launched in June 1994 on its Manila station (DWBM-FM).

A couple of years later, Mareco expanded its Crossover network with 99.1 FM in Bacolod in February 1997, 93.1 FM in Cebu City on September of the same year (later moved to 90.7 FM), 93.1 FM in Davao City in June 1999, and a relay station of Manila over 105.1 FM in Baguio later that year.

On December 30, 2019, Crossover began its transition into a digital-only internet station, as its Manila station officially switched to a Top 40 format after Mareco opted to lease the airtime agreement with Horizon of the Sun Communications (the station is now Q Radio).

Currently, Crossover Radio Online is available via its live streaming application on iOS and Android.

References

Mass media companies of the Philippines
Philippine radio networks
Radio stations established in 1963
Companies based in Quezon City
Philippine companies established in 1963
Mass media companies established in 1963
Privately held companies of the Philippines